SCP may refer to:

Organizations

Political parties
 Soviet Communist Party, the leading political party in the former Soviet Union
 Syrian Communist Party
 Sudanese Communist Party
 Scottish Christian Party

Companies
 Seattle Computer Products, an American computer company
 Smyrne Cassaba & Prolongements, a defunct Ottoman railway company
 Sociedad Comercial del Plata, an Argentine real estate and tourist attraction developer

Schools
 School for Command Preparation, part of the United States Army Command and General Staff College at Fort Leavenworth
 Stanton College Preparatory School, a high school in Jacksonville, Florida, United States

Other organizations
 Salisbury City Police, a defunct city police force in Wiltshire, England operational between 1838–1943
 Sporting Clube de Portugal, a sports club in Lisbon, Portugal, often known outside Portugal as "Sporting Lisbon."
 Society of Catholic Priests, a community of priests in the Anglican Communion
 Society of Christian Philosophers
 Society of Chiropodists and Podiatrists
 Spiritual Counterfeits Project, a Christian evangelical parachurch organization

Mathematics and technology
 Secure copy protocol, an outdated network protocol
 SCP, a UNIX-family OS command for securely copying files across networks using Secure copy protocol
 Service control point, a component of an intelligent network architecture for managing telephony networks
 Softcore processor or soft microprocessor, a processor-implemented through a hardware definition language on a programmable logic device
 Service class provider, in the Digital Imaging and Communications in Medicine standard
 Short circuit protection in power supplies
 Single User Control Program, an East-German CP/M derivative by Robotron
 Sun Certified Professional, a professional certification program by Sun Microsystems
 Set cover problem, a classical problem in computer science and complexity theory
 Save Cursor Position (ANSI), an ANSI X3.64 escape sequence
 Smart, connected products, jargon for products with sensors and software and the ability to connect to a network allowing the product to transmit and receive data
 SAP Cloud Platform, platform as a service by SAP SE

Arts and entertainment
 Super Caesars Palace, a 1993 video game for the Super Nintendo Entertainment System
 SCP Foundation, a collaborative writing website and fictional universe centered around a top-secret organization for the containment of paranormal phenomena
 SCP – Containment Breach, a 2012 survival horror PC game, based on the SCP Foundation universe
 FreeSpace 2 Source Code Project, a collaborative fan project to create an upgraded engine of the computer game FreeSpace 2

Natural sciences
 Single-cell protein
 Sterol carrier protein
 Stromal cell protein
 Superior cerebellar peduncle
 South celestial pole, an imaginary point in the southern celestial hemisphere, directly above the geographic South Pole
 Supernova Cosmology Project, one of the physics research teams discovered that the expansion of the universe is accelerating

Other uses
 Simple commodity production, independent producers trading their own products
 South Caucasus Pipeline
 Strathclyde Country Park
 Structure–conduct–performance paradigm, a model of industrial organization
 Supreme Court of Pakistan
 Sustainable consumption, and production